Frederick Richardson (29 March 1878 – 7 March 1955) was an Australian cricketer. He played one first-class match for Tasmania in 1902.

See also
 List of Tasmanian representative cricketers

References

External links
 

1878 births
1955 deaths
Australian cricketers
Tasmania cricketers
Cricketers from Tasmania